Claus von Wagner (born 28 November 1977) is a German Kabarett artist, a stand-up observational comic and political satirist.

Early life
Born in Munich, von Wagner grew up in Miesbach, south-east of Munich. His father, originally from Prussia, was a lawyer, while his mother was a housewife. On completion of his final school exams he studied Communications Sciences, Modern History and Media Law at Ludwig-Maximillian-University in Munich. He graduated with the degree of "Magister Artium" in 2003. The subject of his master thesis was: "Political cabaret on German television. Between social criticism and self-promotion. An expert survey." Before and during his university-level studies he set up his first "Kabaret" show, "Warten auf Majola", which premiered in 1997.

In 2012 he joined the German TV-show heute-show. In 2014, together with Max Uthoff, he began co-hosting the popular television political satire Kabarett programme, Die Anstalt.[4] In Parallel to his solo run, he was a member of the First German Forced Ensemble from 2004 to 2014. The trio consisted of him alongside Mathias Tretter and Philipp Weber.

Awards
 2016 Dieter Hildebrandt Prize

Personal
Claus von Wagner lives in Munich and has a daughter.

References

External links
 Claus von Wagner explains PEGIDA and Father Christmas (PG)

German cabaret performers
German male comedians
1977 births
People from Miesbach (district)
Living people
ZDF people